Gülyazı is a village in the Uludere District of Şırnak Province in Turkey. The village is populated by Kurds of the Goyan and Sindî tribes and had a population of 2,439 in 2021.

Notable people 

 Ferhat Encü

References 

Villages in Uludere District
Kurdish settlements in Şırnak Province